Big Baby may refer to:
Glen Davis (basketball) (born 1986), American basketball player
Chris Flexen (born 1994), American baseball player
Marcus Jones (fighter) (born 1973), American mixed martial artist
Jarrell Miller (born 1988), American boxer and kickboxer
Shaun Rogers (American football) (born 1979), American football player
Big Baby, a 2015 film
"Big Baby" (House), an episode of House
Big Baby (Toy Story 3), a fictional character in Toy Story 3
Big Babies, British children's television show